Bajouca is a village and a civil parish of the municipality of Leiria, Portugal. The population in 2011 was 2,004, in an area of 13.21 km2.

References

Parishes of Leiria